The following is a list of songs recorded by American rapper/producer Big K.R.I.T.

Big K.R.I.T.